Sirloin Stockade is an American family-style all-you-can-eat buffet steakhouse, restaurant chain and franchisor that was founded in Oklahoma City, Oklahoma in 1966. In June 2016, the parent company, Stockade Companies, operated over 80 restaurants in the United States and Mexico. Some restaurants are company-owned, and some are operated as franchises. Some Sirloin Stockade restaurants have closed in recent years, some of which were in business for a significant amount of time.

Overview
Sirloin Stockade's first restaurant opened in Oklahoma City, Oklahoma in 1966. The original location had a giant 1,800 pound (820 kg) plastic ornamental cow at the location circa the 1970s. Other locations also had, and some continue to have, such large ornamental cows on trailers and mounted atop outdoor signage. Sirloin Stockade restaurants provide an all-you-can-eat buffet, serving breakfast, lunch and dinner. Sirloin Stockade fare include broiled steaks, chicken and fried shrimp, among others. In 2008, there were 28 company-owned and managed Sirloin Stockade restaurants and 74 restaurant franchises. As of June 2016, the company operated over 80 restaurants in 9 U.S. states and in Mexico. As of May 2019, the store locator lists only 15 locations. The restaurants are typically  in size and have around 100–115 employees at each location. Circa December 2014, a Sirloin Stockade location in Galesburg, Illinois discontinued offering steak in its buffet due to escalating beef and food prices, but continued to offer steak as a menu item.

History
Sirloin Stockade has grown into Stockade Companies, a multi-concept restaurant company, presently based in Round Rock, Texas. In 2008, the CEO of Stockade Companies was Tom Ford, who began working for the company on its first day in 1966 as a dishwasher at the debut restaurant in Oklahoma City. Ford worked in additional positions while attending college, and purchased a Sirloin Stockade restaurant in 1979 in the Austin, Texas area. As of June 2016, Ford and Doug Frieling, a franchisee with the company, are the owners of Stockade Companies.

See also
 List of buffet restaurants
 List of steakhouses

References

External links
 

Economy of the Midwestern United States
Economy of the Southwestern United States
Regional restaurant chains in the United States
Buffet restaurants
Steakhouses in the United States
1966 establishments in Oklahoma
Companies based in Round Rock, Texas
Restaurants established in 1966